Acinopus khalisensis is a species of ground beetle in the subfamily Harpalinae and the subgenus Acinopus (Oedemalicus).

References

Harpalinae
Beetles described in 1967